Rolf Alexander Wilhelm (23 June 1927 – 17 January 2013) was a German composer, film composer, arranger and conductor.

Life 
Born in Munich, at the age of seven Wilhelm received piano lessons. Afterwards he attended the grammar school in Berlin and Vienna. From 1942 he studied piano with a special permission with Grete Hinterhofer and musical composition with Joseph Marx at the Wiener Musikhochschule.

His war deployment as Luftwaffenhelfer and the subsequent emprisonment interrupted the musical career of Wilhelm, who returned to destroyed Munich in 1945 with a Notabitur. There he was able to continue his studies at the Hochschule für Musik und Theater München from 1946 and passed the school-leaving examination in 1948. Among his teachers were Heinrich Knappe (conducting), Joseph Haas (musical composition) and Hans Rosbaud (master class)

Even before that, in 1946, Radio München, the forerunner of the Bayerischer Rundfunk, produced The Canterville Ghost, one of its first radio plays after the Second World War. Through the mediation of his brother Kurt Wilhelm who acted as assistant director for the play, the nineteen-year-old composer received his first commission. The work was convincing and Wilhelm advanced to become a busy freelancer for the radio station.

Wilhelm wrote his first major film music in 1954 for the first film of the 08/15 trilogy, which is one of the most successful post-war films in Germany.

Among his most complex film works is the music for the large-scale German production Die Nibelungen (1966/67). The rhythm and sound schemata of Mars from the cycle of symphonic poems The Planets by Gustav Holst are now part of the standard stylistic repertoire of the film composers in Hollywood.

Wilhelm has also composed the music for more than 250 radio plays, over 350 television productions and about 300 commercials. In addition, numerous stage musics, orchestra suites and literary chansons were created. For example, he set texts by Kurt Tucholsky to music.

In addition he composed as a young man pop songs under the pseudonym Alex Rolf Ander. His most famous work under this name was Der kleine Eisbär, published in 1951. The use of this pseudonym did not reach the public during his lifetime and was only made public after his death by his daughter Catharina Wilhelm.

He was married to the actress Helga Neuner, who became known to a wide audience through numerous theater appearances and the television series Die Firma Hesselbach.

Wilhelm died at the age of 85 years on 17 January 2013 with his family.

Filmography

Feature films 
 1954: 08/15
 1954: The Phantom of the Big Tent
 1955: 
 1955: 
 1956: Weil du arm bist, mußt du früher sterben
 1956: Where the Ancient Forests Rustle
 1957: Streifzug durch eine Stadt
 1958: The Green Devils of Monte Cassino
 1959: The Scarlet Baroness
 1959: The Forests Sing Forever
 1959: Heimat – Deine Lieder
 1960: Don Carlos
 1960: Der Schleier fiel…
 1960: Do Not Send Your Wife to Italy
 1960: Die zornigen jungen Männer
 1960: The Inheritance of Bjorndal
 1961: Via Mala
 1961: The Cry of the Wild Geese
 1961: 
 1961: 
 1962: Adorable Julia
 1962: 
 1962: 
 1963: Scotland Yard Hunts Dr. Mabuse
 1963: Ferien vom Ich
 1963: Venusberg
 1964: The River Line
 1964: Tonio Kröger
 1964: 
 1964: The Blood of the Walsungs
 1965: Die schwedische Jungfrau
 1965: When the Grapevines Bloom on the Danube
 1965: Aunt Frieda
 1966: Once a Greek
 1966: Onkel Filser – Allerneueste Lausbubengeschichten
 1966: Die Nibelungen 1. Teil: Siegfried
 1967: Die Nibelungen 2. Teil: Kriemhilds Rache
 1967: Der Paukenspieler
 1967: When Ludwig Goes on Manoeuvres
 1967: The Heathens of Kummerow
 1968: Zur Hölle mit den Paukern
 1969: Pepe, der Paukerschreck
 1969: Ludwig auf Freiersfüßen
 1969: Hurra, die Schule brennt!
 1970: We'll Take Care of the Teachers
 1970: Das Glöcklein unterm Himmelbett
 1971: 
 1971: Morgen fällt die Schule aus
 1972: Betragen ungenügend!
 1973: The Flying Classroom
 1974: When Mother Went on Strike
 1977: 
 1977: 
 1977: The Serpent's Egg
 1977: 
 1979: The Wonderful Years
 1980: From the Life of the Marionettes
 1982: Doctor Faustus
 1988: Ödipussi
 1989: 
 1990: 
 1991: Pappa Ante Portas

Television 
 1954: Jonas der Angler
 1956: Der Kran
 1961: Zu viele Köche
 1965: 
 1967/68: Sherlock Holmes
 1969–1970: 
 1970: 
 1974: Telerop 2009 – Es ist noch was zu retten
 1975: Tatort: Als gestohlen gemeldet
 1978:  (TV miniseries)
 1986: Tatort: Riedmüller, Vorname Sigi 
 1987: Tatort: Pension Tosca oder Die Sterne lügen nicht 
 1992: Die Ringe des Saturn
 also episodes to the series , Der Kommissar and Derrick

Awards 
 Verdienstorden der Bundesrepublik Deutschland (1993)
 Bayerischer Poetentaler of the 
 ITEA Lifetime Achievement Award (2012)

Discography 
 Deutsche Filmkomponisten, Folge 4, Rolf Wilhelm, Bear Family Records, 2001, BCD 16484 AR
 Rolf Wilhelm 1: Tarabas / Hiob (director: Michael Kehlmann), 2006 Alhambra (A 8957)
 Rolf Wilhelm 2: Flucht ohne Ende / Radetzkymarsch (series: Michael Kehlmann), 2006 Alhambra (A8958)
 Die Nibelungen, 2001 Cobra (CR 006A/B)
 Loriot: Pappa ante Portas (soundtrack)
 Loriot: Ödipussi (soundtrack)
 Hugo Hartung – Ich denke oft an Piroschka. Direction Kurt Wilhelm 
 Lausbubengeschichten von Ludwig Thoma. Narrated by Willy Rösner (spoken record)
 Kurt Wilhelm – Der Brandner Kaspar und das ewig' Leben. Komödie nach einer Erzählung, Motiven und Gedichten von Franz von Kobell. Music: Rolf Wilhelm (spoken record)
 Jonas der Angler/Lektro: Die verschwundene Melodie. Joachim Fuchsberger liest moderne Märchen von Reiner Zimnik. (spoken record)
 Gisela May singt Tucholsky
 Der Sängerkrieg der Heidehasen. Ein Hörspiel für Groß und Klein von James Krüss.

Further reading 
 Rolf Wilhelm – „Manchmal wird die Musik zugekleistert …“, Interview with Raimund Saxinger and Matthias Büdinger, in Filmharmonische Blätter. Issue 7/October/November 1987, 
 Rolf Wilhelm – Musik bedeutet immerwährendes Asyl, Interview in two parts with Stefan Schlegel, in Cinema Musica. Edition 1/July 2005,  and edition 2 October 2005,

External links 
 Interview im Filmmusik Weblog
 
 Rolf Wilhelm in Deutschen Komponistenarchiv

References 

German film score composers
20th-century German composers
Recipients of the Cross of the Order of Merit of the Federal Republic of Germany
1927 births
2013 deaths
Musicians from Munich
Luftwaffenhelfer
German prisoners of war in World War II